Rowland Pettit (February 6, 1927 – December 10, 1981) was an Australian-born American chemist. He was awarded an overseas scholarship from the Royal Commission 1851 from 1952 - 1954. He came to London to Queen Mary College to conduct research into "the molecular orbital theory of organic chemistry and its application". 

Pettit was noted for preparation of Cyclobutadieneiron tricarbonyl and the related trimethylenemethane complex.
Pettit was head of the Department of Chemistry and W. T. Doherty Professor in Chemistry at the University of Texas, Austin,
a member of the National Academy of Sciences,
a member of the American Chemical Society,
a member of the Chemical Society of London,
a recipient of the American Chemical Society's the Southwest Regional Award,
a member of the American Academy of Arts and Sciences.

The University of Texas said that Pettit was an "internationally recognized organic chemist".

Chronology 
 1927 born in Port Lincoln, Australia
 1949 B.Sc, University of Adelaide
 1950 M.Sc, University of Adelaide
 1953 PhD in chemistry, University of Adelaide
 1954 2nd PhD, Queen Mary College in London 
 1957 assistant professor, the University of Texas, Austin
 1960 associate professor, the University of Texas, Austin
 1963 professor of chemistry, the University of Texas, Austin
 1968 Southwest Regional Award, the American Chemical Society
 1970-1974 Chairman of Department of Chemistry, the University of Texas, Austin
 1973 elected to the National Academy of Sciences
 1980 advanced to W. T. Doherty Professor in Chemistry, the University of Texas, Austin
 1981 dies in Austin, Texas

References

External links 

 John C. Gilbert, "Rowland Pettit", Biographical Memoirs of the National Academy of Sciences (1995)

1927 births
1981 deaths
20th-century American chemists
University of Texas faculty
University of Adelaide alumni
Alumni of Queen Mary University of London
Members of the United States National Academy of Sciences
Australian emigrants to the United States